Richard Hidalgo (February 14, 1967 — May 8, 2019) was a Peruvian mountain climber and mountain guide member of the Association of Mountain Guides of Peru (AGMP) and the International Union of Mountain Guide Associations (UIAGM).

He was the first climber in Peru to access the summit of six of the fourteen mountains above 8000 m s.n.m. without complementary oxygen. He managed to climb the peaks of Kilimanjaro, Chachani, Aconcagua and Cho Oyu.

On the morning of May 8, 2019, he was found dead in his tent located in camp 2 of Makalu Mountain, at 6600 m, by Sherpa members of his expedition.

References 

1967 births
2019 deaths
Mountain guides
Mountaineering deaths
Peruvian mountain climbers
Sport deaths in Nepal
People from Lima